Francis Geng (23 September 1931 – 10 April 2022) was a French politician. A member of the Union for French Democracy, he served in the National Assembly from 1978 to 1993. He died on 10 April 2022 at the age of 90.

References

1931 births
2022 deaths
Deputies of the 6th National Assembly of the French Fifth Republic
Deputies of the 7th National Assembly of the French Fifth Republic
Deputies of the 8th National Assembly of the French Fifth Republic
Deputies of the 9th National Assembly of the French Fifth Republic
Union for French Democracy politicians
Centre of Social Democrats politicians
Politicians from Paris